Charaxes lemosi is a butterfly in the family Nymphalidae. The species was described by James John Joicey and George Talbot in 1927. It is found on the island of Príncipe. The habitat consists of forests.

Description
Its diet consists mostly of fermented fruits.

Taxonomy
The species has been treated as a subspecies of Charaxes lucretius by some authorities eg Gabriel (1932) and van Someren (1957).

References

External links

Charaxes lemosi images at Consortium for the Barcode of Life

Butterflies described in 1927
lemosi
Endemic fauna of Príncipe
Butterflies of Africa
Taxa named by James John Joicey
Taxa named by George Talbot (entomologist)